Wilbur Haverfield Cramblet (July 10, 1892 – November 5, 1975) was an American college football coach, mathematics professor, and college president. He was the head football coach at Phillips University in Enid, Oklahoma from 1915 to 1916 and Bethany College in Bethany, West Virginia in 1918.
He served as the dean of students at Bethany from 1918 to 1920 and later as the college president from 1934 to 1952.

Cramblet died on November 5, 1975, at a hospital Wheeling, West Virginia.

References

External links
 

1892 births
1975 deaths
20th-century American academics
Heads of universities and colleges in the United States
Bethany Bison football coaches
Phillips Haymakers football coaches
Yale University alumni
People from Harrison County, Ohio